Kevin Rodgers may refer to:

Kevin Rodgers, musician in Golden Shower (band)
Kevin Rodgers, candidate in Doncaster Council election, 2010

See also
Kevin Rogers (disambiguation)